Bitòn Coulibaly (1689?–1755), also known as Mamary Coulibaly,  founded the Bambara Empire in what is now Mali's Ségou Region and Mopti Region.

Biography

Great-grandson of former Ségou king Kaladian Coulibaly, Mamary Coulibaly settled in Ségou in his youth and soon became head of the Tòn, a voluntary organization for young men, taking the title of "Bitòn."  Under Coulibaly's leadership, the Tòn transformed from an egalitarian society into an army of "Tondions."  Prompted by popular uprising against the king of Ségou, the populace suggested he take over the leadership of the Bambara kingdom. Coulibaly quickly subdued rival chiefs of Ségou through a vote a cloture of the chiefs, and used the city as a capital for his new Bambara Empire.

Fortifying himself with defensive techniques from the Songhai tradition, Coulibaly created a thousand-man army and a navy of war canoes to patrol the Niger River, staffing both with men already captured in his conquests.  Coulibaly then proceeded to launch successful assaults against his neighbors, the Fulani, the Soninke, and the Mossi; he also attacked Tomboctou, though he held the city only briefly.  During this time he also founded the city of Bla as an outpost and armory.

He built a mosque in Ségou.

Coulibaly's new empire thrived on trade with the Berbers to the north due to the Islamic influence, including that of local slaves captured in its many wars. The slaves were drafted in the army, used for labor and or resold to African local traders to the south and west (not European Slave trade);  the demand for slaves then fueled the empire on to further wars.

Bitòn Coulibaly was succeeded by Dinkoro Coulibaly following his death in 1755 and Ali Coulibaly.  However, the Coulibalys handed down the throne to Ngolo Diarra, a slave or servant of Biton Coulibaly, in 1766. Slaves had the right to property, and could win their way to nobility, as Diarra did.

Tomb
In 2019 Coulibaly's tomb had the inscription "Biton Mamary Coulibaly / Founder of the Kingdom / Banana of Segou Sekoro / Reign 1712-1755".

In popular culture
Super Biton de Ségou, a Malian afro-jazz band, was founded in the 1960s in Ségou. Named after Bitòn Coulibaly, they are Mali's oldest dance band, and one of the oldest African orchestras.

References

Lilyan, Kesteloot: L'Epopée Bambara de Ségou I and II, Paris : Fernand Nathan, 1971. Paris : Editions L'Harmattan, 1993.
Davidson, Basil: Africa in History. New York: Simon & Schuster, 1995.

External links
Timeline of Western Sudan (Metropolitan Museum: Heilbrunn Timeline of Art History.)
Pre-colonial Malian History (in French)

18th-century Malian people
Bamana Empire
1755 deaths
18th-century rulers in Africa
Year of birth unknown